Yaroslava Shvedova won the title, beating defending champion Mara Santangelo 6–4, 6–4 in the final.

Singles results

Seeds

Draw

Finals

Top half

Bottom half

References

2007 WTA Tour
Bangalore Open